Mount Holmes is a prominent mountain peak in Yellowstone National Park.  It is the tallest mountain in the Wyoming portion of the Gallatin Range.  Mount Holmes is located in the northwestern part of the park and marks the southern terminus of the Gallatin Range. It is the source of Indian Creek, a tributary of the Gardner River.

There was a historic fire watch tower near the top of Mount Holmes, before it was burned due to a lightning strike. The Bannock Trail crosses the mountains close to Mount Holmes.

History

An 1860 map by Captain William F. Raynolds showed this peak as Mount Gallatin.  Prior to 1878, the peak was routinely referred to as Mount Madison because of its proximity to the Madison River.  In 1878 Henry Gannett and geologist William H. Holmes, members of the third Hayden Geologic Survey, ascended the peak.  Gannett named the peak Mount Holmes.

The summit of Mount Holmes can be reached via the  Mount Holmes-Winter Creek trail.  The trailhead is located near Apollonaris Spring on the Mammoth-Norris section of the Grand Loop Road.

See also
 Mountains and mountain ranges of Yellowstone National Park
 Mount Holmes (Utah)

Notes

Mountains of Yellowstone National Park
Mountains of Wyoming
Mountains of Park County, Wyoming